Adriana-Nicoleta Nechita (former Olteanu; born 14 November 1983) is a Romanian handballer who plays for HCM Baia Mare and the Romanian national team.

International honours
EHF Champions League:
Finalist: 2010
Semifinalist: 2009, 2012, 2013
EHF Champions Trophy:
Winner: 2007
EHF Cup Winners' Cup:
Winner: 2007
Semifinalist: 2002

Gallery

References

 

1983 births
Living people
People from Dolj County
Romanian female handball players
Olympic handball players of Romania
Handball players at the 2008 Summer Olympics
SCM Râmnicu Vâlcea (handball) players
CS Minaur Baia Mare (women's handball) players